Awake is the first extended play by Georgian-Greek singer Tamta. It was released for digital download on 3 July 2020, by Minos EMI.

Singles
The album's lead single, "Sex with Your Ex", was written by Roel Rats, Marcia Sondeijker, Ben Cassorla, Alexandra Veltri, and produced by Ben Cassorla, Roulsen, and was released on 15 November 2019. The album's second single, "My Zone", was written and produced by Boombamontana, and was released on 7 April 2020. The album's third single, "Yala", was written by Stéphane Legar, Doli & Penn, Roel Rats, Marcia Sondeijker, Lonneke Eline Zijlstra, Tim Langley and produced by Roulsen, and was released on 28 July 2020. The album's fourth single, "Hold On", was written by Barrice, Sin Laurent, Daphne Lawrence and produced by BoombaMontana, and was released on 27 October 2020. The album's fifth single, "Awake", was written by Roel Rats, Marcia Sondeijker, Andrew Holyfield, Eric Lumiere, Ryuichi Flores and produced by Roulsen, and was released on 13 January 2021.

Track listing

Personnel

 Roulsen – mixing (track 1), mastering (track 4)
 Ben Cassorla – mastering (track 4)
 Kyriakos Asteriou – mastering (track 7)
 Beyond – mixing, mastering (track 2, 6)
 Luminescence – mixing, mastering (track 5)
 Teo Pouzbouris – mixing (track 7)
 Davide Ruffini – mastering (track 1)

References

Tamta albums
Minos EMI EPs
2020 EPs